GRN-529 is a drug that was developed by Wyeth as a negative allosteric modulator of the metabotropic glutamate receptor 5 (mGluR5).

A study conducted by Pfizer found that GRN-529 reduced repetitive behaviors without sedation and partially increased sociability in mouse models of autism. 

Another study conducted by Pfizer found a therapeutically relevant effect in animal models of depression. It is theorized to work by reducing glutamate receptor hyperactivity.

See also 
 Fenobam
 MPEP
 MTEP

References

External links 
 

Alkyne derivatives
Benzamides
Organofluorides
MGlu5 receptor antagonists
Wyeth brands
Pfizer brands